Channapetta is a village in Kollam district of Kerala state, India. It is situated 8 km away from the nearest town Anchal.  

Channapetta lies on the foothills of the Western Ghats. Kerala Government has an e-literacy project centre, Akshaya, in the village.

References 

Villages in Kollam district